The Monument to Miftahetdin Akmulla, built in 2008, is a monument  at Bashkir State Pedagogical University in Ufa, Bashkortostan. Opened in 2008.

References

Monuments and memorials in Ufa
Statues in Russia
Sculptures of men in Russia
Outdoor sculptures in Russia